Manuel da Costa Andrade  (born 8 October 1944) is a Portuguese judge who served as President of the Constitutional Court and ex officio Councilor of State from 2016 to 2021. He is a Professor Emeritus of the Faculty of Law of the University of Coimbra.

Manuel da Costa Andrade obtained his law degree from the Faculty of Law of the University of Coimbra in 1970, pursuing a career in academica. He concluded his Doctorate in Criminal Law Science (Ciências Jurídico-Criminais) in 1990, having taught and published several works on the subject of criminal law, criminal procedure, and criminology.

Costa Andrade served as a member of the Constituent Assembly, the parliament convened in 1975–76 for the purpose of drafting a constitution for the Third Portuguese Republic, following the Carnation Revolution. Affiliated with the Social Democratic Party, he went on to serve as a Member of the Assembly of the Republic from 1976 to 1995.

On 20 July 2016, he was elected Justice of the Constitutional Court by the Assembly of the Republic. On 22 July, he was elected by his peers, 7th President of the Constitutional Court. By virtue of his office, he became a Councilor of State, sworn in at Belém Palace on 29 September 2016. He was succeeded by João Caupers in 2021.

Distinctions

National orders
 Grand Cross of the Military Order of Christ (12 February 2021)
 Grand Officer of the Order of Prince Henry the Navigator (8 June 2009)

References

Members of the Assembly of the Republic (Portugal)
21st-century Portuguese judges
Social Democratic Party (Portugal) politicians
University of Coimbra alumni
1944 births
Living people
Grand Crosses of the Order of Christ (Portugal)
Grand Officers of the Order of Prince Henry